The 16th Annual Screen Actors Guild Awards, honoring the best achievements in film and television performances for the year 2009, were presented on January 23, 2010 at the Shrine Exposition Center in Los Angeles, California for the fourteenth consecutive year. It was broadcast live simultaneously by TNT and TBS.

The nominees were announced on December 17, 2009 by Michelle Monaghan and Chris O'Donnell at Los Angeles' Pacific Design Center's Silver Screen Theater.

Winners and nominees
Winners are listed first and highlighted in boldface.

Screen Actors Guild Life Achievement Award 
 Betty White

Film

Television

In Memoriam
Sigourney Weaver introduced the "In Memoriam" segment which honored:

Natasha Richardson
Monte Hale
Henry Gibson
Betsy Blair
Robert Ginty
Ed McMahon
Philip Carey
Dom DeLuise
Brittany Murphy
Carl Ballantine
Ron Silver
Dennis Cole
John Quade
Richard Todd
Fred Travalena
Cheryl Holdridge
Joseph Wiseman
Arnold Stang
Gene Barry
Collin Wilcox Paxton
Farrah Fawcett
Russ Conway
Soupy Sales
Gale Storm
Steven Gilborn
Lou Jacobi
Dick Durock
Michael Jackson
Wayne Tippit
Harve Presnell
Alaina Reed Hall
James Whitmore
Jim Hutchison
Karl Malden
Paul Burke
Edward Woodward
Frank Aletter
Bea Arthur
David Carradine
Jennifer Jones
Patrick Swayze

References

External links 

2009
2009 film awards
2009 television awards
2009 guild awards
Screen
Screen Actors Guild
Screen
January 2010 events in the United States